.mk is the Internet country code top-level domain (ccTLD) for Republic of North Macedonia. It is administered by the Macedonian Academic Research Network (MARnet).

Registering .mk domains
Anyone can register a .mk domain. Registration is possible directly at the second level without any restrictions. Registrations under a number of second level domains are also possible, however those use of those domains are restricted to certain entities.

Structure

Cyrillic domain

The Internationalized Cyrillic country code top-level domain .мкд was officially approved and registered on March 20, 2014.

See also

 Telecommunications in North Macedonia

References

External links 
 Macedonian Academic Research Network
 IANA .mk whois information

Country code top-level domains
Communications in North Macedonia
Council of European National Top Level Domain Registries members